is a Japanese professional shogi player ranked 8-dan. He is a former holder of the Ōi title.

Promotion history
The promotion history for Sugai is as follows:
 6-kyū: September 29, 2004
 4-dan: April 1, 2010
 5-dan: August 21, 2011
 6-dan: March 10, 2015
 7-dan: November 5, 2015
 8-dan: January 23, 2020

Titles and other championships
Sugai's has appeared in two major title matches to date. His first appearance came in 2017 when he defeated Yoshiharu Habu to win the 58th Ōi title. The following year, however, he was unable to successfully defend his title against Masayuki Toyoshima, losing the 59th Ōi title match 4 games to 3.

In addition to the 58th Ōi title, Sugai has won four other shogi championships during his career: the 5th  in 2011, the 46th  in 2015, the 29th  in 2021, and the 15th  in 2021.

Awards and honors
Sugai has received the following Japan Shogi Association Annual Shogi Awards: "Best New Player" (2011), "Best Winning Percentage" (2014), "Most Games Won" (2014), “Kōzō Masuda Award” (2014), and "Fighting-spirit" (2021).

Year-end prize money and game fee ranking
Sugai has finished in the "Top 10" of the JSA's  four times: 7th with JPY 23,630,000 in earnings in 2017; 9th with JPY 21,930,000 in earnings in 2018; 10th with JPY 16,740,000 in earnings in 2021; and 7th with JPY 19,700,000 in earnings in 2022.

References

External links
ShogiHub: Professional Player Info · Sugai, Tatsuya
Shogi Fan: Sugai Tatsuya steals the Oui title from Habu
Ryūkikai - Official Sugai supporters' website 
人生0手の読み: 菅井流＆新手を思いつく限り列挙したらとんでもない量になった · lists some of Sugai's novelty opening innovations 
Habu vs Sugai 2017 Ōi match · novelty Third File Rook opening
Habu vs Sugai 2017 August 29 Ōi match · novelty Third File Rook opening

1992 births
Japanese shogi players
Living people
Professional shogi players
People from Okayama
Professional shogi players from Okayama Prefecture
Ōi (shogi)
Recipients of the Kōzō Masuda Award
Shinjin-Ō
Ginga